Wei Hsueh-kang, also known by various other names, is a Chinese-born business tycoon and drug trafficker wanted by the United States and Thailand for illegally trafficking drugs in New York and Southeast Asia's Golden Triangle. He is also a regional commander of the United Wa State Army, the armed forces of the de facto independent Wa State in Myanmar.

Pseudonyms 
During his career as a drug trafficker, Wei adopted several pseudonyms to evade capture by authorities. His pseudonyms include Wu Xingwen, Prasit Cheewinnitipanya, Charnchai Cheevinnitipanya, and Suchat Phanloetkun, among others.

Early life 
According to his Thai documents, Wei Hsueh-kang was born in 1945 in Yunnan, China. However, the United States Department of State gives Wei's date of birth as 29 May 1952.

After the Communist victory in the Chinese Civil War in 1949, Wei fled from mainland China to Burma (present-day Myanmar) with his father, who was then a member of the Kuomintang supported by the CIA. Wei helped his father sell opium, in part to fund the Kuomintang's insurgency in mainland China, until his graduation from high school, upon which he joined a militia led by the drug lord Khun Sa.

Career

As an insurgent 
Wei followed the leadership of Khun Sa for two decades, first as a member of Khun Sa's personal militia and then as a member of the Mong Tai Army (MTA). After falling out of favour with Khun Sa in the mid-1980s, Wei left the MTA and began to work with the Wa military leader Bao Youxiang. Wei and Bao were among the founders of the United Wa State Party (UWSP) in 1989, the latter eventually becoming its leader. Bao subsequently made Wei a regional commander of the party's armed wing, the United Wa State Army (UWSA).

As a drug trafficker 
Wei is believed to have remained closely associated with Khun Sa even after he left the MTA, especially during the height of opium production in the Golden Triangle. He is wanted by the United States' Bureau of International Narcotics and Law Enforcement Affairs for drug offences committed in New York; there is a US$2 million reward for information leading to his capture and arrest. Wei is currently believed to be residing in Myanmar, likely within the UWSA-controlled territory of Wa State.

Although Wei was granted Thai citizenship in 1985, three years later in 1988 he was facing a sentence of life imprisonment by the Thai government. He jumped bail, however, and his Thai citizenship was later revoked in 2001.

Wei has since downsized his involvement in drug trafficking, partly in response to his wanted status by the United States.

As a business tycoon 
In 1998, Wei founded the Hong Pang Group with the money he had amassed from his time as a drug trafficker, as well as money he had gained by taking advantage of the privileges offered in the ceasefire deal by General Khin Nyunt. The Hong Pang Group owns and controls a multitude of businesses in agriculture, commerce, construction, distilleries, electronics and communications, mining, and petroleum. The Hong Pang Group is based in Pangkham and has regional offices in Yangon, Mandalay, Lashio, Tachilek, and Mawlamyine.

A fire in Pangkham on 18 April 2009 destroyed the largest petrol station in the city and over 10,000 tons of teak in a warehouse; both buildings belonged to Wei.

Following the 2015 jade mine disaster in Hpakant, Kachin State, the London-based NGO Global Witness accused Wei of exploiting locals and illegally funding mining operations in the area. This claim however, could not be verified or denied by Wei himself, as he was still in hiding.

Notes

References

External links 
  WEI Hsueh Kang, United Wa State Army, Financial Network  US Treasury Office of Foreign Assets Control, November 2008
 The Wa Nation TIME Asia,  16 December 2002
 Burma's Drug Kings TIME Asia,  16 December 2002
 How many drug lords are in Myanmar?  People's Daily 2005

1952 births
People from Yunnan
Wei Hsueh-kang
Burmese people of Chinese descent
Living people
Chinese drug traffickers
Burmese warlords